In mathematics, an LLT polynomial is one of a family of symmetric functions introduced by Alain Lascoux, Bernard Leclerc, and Jean-Yves Thibon (1997) as q-analogues of products of Schur functions.

J. Haglund, M. Haiman, N. Loehr (2005) showed how to expand Macdonald polynomials in terms of LLT polynomials. Ian Grojnowski and Mark Haiman (2007, preprint) proved a positivity conjecture for LLT polynomials that combined with the previous result implies the Macdonald positivity conjecture for Macdonald polynomials, and extended the definition of LLT polynomials to arbitrary finite root systems.

References
I. Grojnowski, M. Haiman, Affine algebras and positivity (preprint available here)
J. Haglund, M. Haiman, N. Loehr A Combinatorial Formula for Macdonald Polynomials   J. Amer. Math. Soc.  18  (2005),  no. 3, 735–761
Alain Lascoux, Bernard Leclerc, and Jean-Yves Thibon Ribbon Tableaux, Hall-Littlewood Functions, Quantum Affine Algebras and Unipotent Varieties  J. Math. Phys. 38 (1997), no. 2, 1041–1068.

Symmetric functions
Algebraic geometry
Algebraic combinatorics
Q-analogs
Polynomials